Bridgehill is an area of Consett in County Durham, England. It is situated near Benfieldside, Blackhill, Shotley Grove, and the River Derwent.

References

External links

Villages in County Durham
Consett